

Discography

Discographies of American record labels